Michael Chang was the defending champion, and successfully defended his title.

Chang defeated Renzo Furlan 7–5, 6–3 in the final.

Seeds

Draw

Finals

Top half

Bottom half

References

 Main Draw

1995 ATP Tour